AISSMS College of Pharmacy, Pune is a Pharmacy college affiliated to the AICTE, PCI, New Delhi and University of Pune, India. It was established in 1996. AISSMS COP is among the top Pharmacy colleges in the private sector in Maharashtra. AISSMS (All India Shri Shivaji Memorial Society) is an Institute founded by Chattrapati Shri Shahu Maharaj and H. H. Shri Madhavraoji Scindia. AISSMS college of Pharmacy is located close to the Regional Transport Office and shares its campus with an Engineering college and Business School. At present, the following courses are conducted at the institution-Bachelor of Pharmacy (B.Pharm),Masters in Pharmacy (M.Pharm). Recently AISSMS COP has been recognized as a PhD institute. The college is located on 72,000 sq. ft of land.

History
With the aim of promoting noble cause of education, which plays a very vital role in the socio-economic scenario of a country, All India Shri. Shivaji Memorial Society was established in 1917, by the then rulers of Kolhapur (Late Shri. Shrimant Chattrapati Shahu Maharaj of Kolhapur), Gwalior (H.H. Late Alija Bahadur Madhavrao Scindia Maharaj of Gwalior), Baroda and Indore. Over the last few years the society has diversified by encompassing technical and management education in its portfolio. The Society is running around 19 institutions in different fields of education, and has completed 92 years of meritorious service.

The AISSMS College of Pharmacy was established in the year 1996 with the approval of AICTE, PCI, and Govt. of Maharashtra and affiliated to Pune University. College offers the following courses.

Location
All India Shree Shivaji Memorial Society's College of Pharmacy (AISSMS CoP) is located right in the heart of the city, i.e., RTO Office, Shivajinagar. It is a mere 10-minute walk from Pune railway station and has excellent accessibility from all parts of the city, be it buses or trains.

Academics

Courses offered
-Bachelor of Pharmacy (B.Pharm)- 100 Seats  
-Masters in Pharmacy (M.Pharm) – 48 Seats

AISSMS College of Pharmacy has been recognized as Research Center for PhD Degree.

Research
AISSMS College of Pharmacy is doing research on AIDS virus.

Co-curricular Activities
The college conducts many activities, including the sports week which is held every year generally during the month of December; as well as the college gathering, an event that is held once every two years. While the sports week includes outdoor and indoor games such as cricket, football, basketball, volleyball, chess, carrom, table tennis, badminton etc., the college gathering includes various events such as drama, dance, singing, scientific model making, personality contest and orchestra. Also, the college holds an alumni meet every year to create a platform for interaction between the students and the alumni.

References

External links
 AISSMS College of Pharmacy College Website

Pharmacy colleges in Maharashtra
Research institutes in Pune
Universities and colleges in Pune
Monuments and memorials to Shivaji
Colleges affiliated to Savitribai Phule Pune University
Educational institutions established in 1996
1996 establishments in Maharashtra